, also known as simply Otokojuku, is a Japanese manga series written and illustrated by Akira Miyashita. It was originally serialized in Shueisha's Weekly Shōnen Jump from 1985 to 1991. It is staged in an all-boys school that teaches how to be true men. The students are trained to "revive the Spirit of Japan" and mainly engage in events where they will polish their manhood and push through with their guts.

Plot

The genius principal of the private school, Heihachi Edajima, was a war hero during World War II. He trained his students to play an active role in politics, economics and industries in Japan and all over the world, though the way of training is highly anachronistic.

The martial arts depicted in this series are also highly choreographed using various forms of martial arts.

Story

Early Gag Manga Arc
The strongest of the Otokojuku first years, Momotaro Tsurugi, while enduring and overcoming the strict training of the malicious instructors and the second years, resolves the problems of the other first years with wisdom, kindness, and a manly spirit.

Kyoura Daiyon Kyousatsu Arc
The budget of Otokojuku falls into the red, so Edajima devises to throw the  festival in order to collect profits. However just as the festival reaches a climax, Omito Date and his Kanto Gogakuren attack. Date and the Gogakuren agree and the battles take place on the sacred Mt. Fuji.

Dai Ishin Pa-Lien Seiha Arc
After the conclusion of the Kyoura Daiyon Kyousatsu, Momo descends the mountain to find his friends still alive. Their joyous moment is interrupted when they are called out by the third years.

Tenchou Gorin Dai Bukai Arc
After the Pa-Lien Seiha is ended, Momo and the gang are called to the headmaster's room. There they are shown a war film about how the US Army discovered a skillfully disguised Japanese Army secret base and destroyed it. When some of the students doubt this, Edajima tells them of a man who held a position in the US Army. That man's name was Takemitsu Isa, now known as Hyoei Todo.

Battle of the Seven Tusks Arc
One month after the Tenchou Gorin, Momo and the gang welcome the newly enrolled students. During Momo's fight over his title as representative with new first year Souji Togo, an incident occurs in the headmaster's room. Despite his overwhelming fighting power, Edajima suffers a defeat before a capture gun strong enough to take down an elephant. He is kidnapped and his assailants escape into the air.

Fuun Rakanjuku Arc
Edajima's lifelong rival Kinzo Kumada creates another Otokojuku called , and as they agreed upon thirteen years ago, Otokojuku and Rakanjuku compete against each other in the  match.

Media

Manga
Sakigake!! Otokojuku was serialized in Shueisha's shōnen manga magazine, Weekly Shōnen Jump from Issue 22 of 1985 to Issue 35 of 1991. The series was collected in 34 collected volumes published under the Jump Comics imprint.

Renta! holds the digital rights for the manga. As of August 2018, they had released the first 3 volumes. The digital rights are also held by Manga Planet.

Spin-off works
 By Akira Miyashita
 : A manga about two heavenly deities contesting for the succession of their father's throne. Edajima and several of the students make cameos, having graduated and moved on to their careers.
 : Set over 10 years after the conclusion of Sakigake!! Otokojuku, this manga focuses on Shishimaru Tsurugi, son of Momotaro Tsurugi from the previous series, and a new generation of Otokojuku students, while still featuring much of the same school staff. Like Sakigake!!, the plot focuses on the hellish training of Otokojuku, fighting enemies, and the births of new friendships.
 : On Edajima's restless childhood and youthful days.
 
 
 
 
 

 By other authors
 : April 25, 2014–ongoing; by Tomokazu Ozamatsu; 5 volumes
 : January 23, 2015–ongoing; by Michi Saitou; 5 volumes
 : May 25, 2015–ongoing; by Tōichirō Yanagida; 4 volumes
 : May 30, 2016–ongoing; by Yuuji Takezoe; 1 volume
 : October 4, 2017–ongoing; by Satoshi Miyagawa

Anime

TV series
Sakigake!! Otokojuku was adapted into an anime television series produced by Toei Animation. Directed by Nobutaka Nishizawa, the series aired on Fuji TV from February 25 to November 14, 1988, lasting 34 episodes.

Episodes

Movie
An animated movie was released on July 23, 1988. It tells the story of a team of First Year students led by Momotaro Tsurugi who journey to America to compete in a tournament known as Great Battle August, adjudicated by a priest. Following an elimination round, 4 of the Otokojuku must fight 1 on 1 matches with members of the American team 3S; B.J. Bruce, Sir Royal the 3rd, Big Morgan and Bronco Sanders. The Otokojuku eventually win the match.

Audio drama
After the anime was ended, a two-part audio drama tape was sold, covering the Tenchou Gorin Arc. The same voice cast from the anime was used.

 Episodes
Preliminary League Arc
 Hien vs. Shuten Doji
 Jaki Daigouin vs. Zeus
 Omito Date vs. Ryuuhou
 Momotaro Tsurugi vs. Shu Kougen
Finals League Arc
 Genji Togashi/Ryuuji Toramaru vs. Amon/Unmon
 Momotarou Tsurugi vs. Pharaoh
 Gekkou vs. Souketsu
 Omito Date vs. Ryoukou

Live-action film

It was adapted on a live-action film in 2008 written, directed by and starring Tak Sakaguchi.

Video games
 Famicom game - Sakigake!! Otokojuku (released March 3, 1989).
 Game Boy game - Sakigake!! Otokojuku - Meiō-tō Kessen (released August 4, 1990)
 PlayStation game - Simple 2000 - The Dodgeball - Sakigake!! Otokojuku (released August 29, 2002)
 PlayStation 2 game - Sakigake!! Otokojuku (released November 10, 2005)
Playable characters: Heihachi Edajima, Momotaro Tsurugi, Genji Togashi, Ryuuji Toramaru, J, Gouji Akashi, Raiden, Gekko, Hien, Omito Date, Manjimaru, Senkuu, Eikei, Rasetsu, Jaki Daigouin, Pharaoh, Sou Reigen, Gouki Toudou, Hakuhou, Zeus, Shishimaru Tsurugi (secret).
Nintendo DS game - Jump Ultimate Stars (released November 23, 2006)
PlayStation 3 game - Sakigake!! Otokojuku: Nihon yo, Kore ga Otoko de aru!! (released February 27, 2014)
Playable characters: Heihachi Edajima, Momotaro Tsurugi, Genji Togashi, J, Ryuuji Toramaru, Taio Matsuo, Shinichiro Tazawa, Hidemaro Gokukouji, Gouji Akashi, Raiden, Hien, Gekko, Omito Date, Manjimaru, Senkuu, Rasetsu, Eikei, Dokugantetsu, Henshouki, Baron Dino, Jaki Daigouin, Wang Taren
The series was also represented in four cross-over games: Famicom Jump and Famicom Jump II: The Strongest Seven, both for the NES; Cult Jump for the Game Boy; and J-Stars Victory VS for PlayStation 3 and PlayStation Vita. J-Stars Victory VS was ported to PlayStation 4 and released with its two counterparts in Europe and North America, thus representing the first official release of Sakigake!! Otokojuku material outside Japan.

Reception

It is one of the best-selling Weekly Shōnen Jump's manga series of all time as it had sold over 26 million copies.

References

External links
 Sakigake!! Otokojuku Toei Animation Site (Japanese)
 Otokojuku Shueisha Home Page (Japanese)
 PS2 Game Official Site (Japanese)
 Sakigake!! Otokojuku Live Action Film Official Site (Japanese)
 

1
1985 manga
1988 anime television series debuts
2001 manga
2014 manga
Fuji TV original programming
Martial arts anime and manga
Nihon Bungeisha manga
Seinen manga
Shōnen manga
Shueisha franchises
Shueisha manga
Toei Animation television
Toei Animation films